Family Bible is the 25th studio album by country singer Willie Nelson. He plays guitar and is accompanied by Bobbie Nelson on piano. The album was dedicated to Mama Nelson.

Track listing
 "By the Rivers of Babylon" (0:50)
 "Stand by Me" (3:03)
 "It Is No Secret (What God Can Do)" (Stuart Hamblen) (5:00)
 "There Shall Be Showers of Blessings" (3:40)
 "Softly and Tenderly" (4:34)
 "Tell It to Jesus" (3:22)
 "Family Bible" (Claude Gray, Paul Buskirk, Walter Breeland) (2:52)
 "In God's Eyes" (Willie Nelson) (3:27)
 "Revive Us Again" (2:23)
 "An Evening Prayer" (C. Maude Battersby, Charles Hutchison Gabriel) (1:40)
 "Kneel at the Feet of Jesus" (Willie Nelson) (3:00)

Personnel
 Willie Nelson - guitar, vocals
 Bobbie Nelson - Bösendorfer piano
Technical
Phil York - engineer, photography

Chart performance

1980 albums
Willie Nelson albums